Sheffield Inn, also known as the Sheffield Apartments, is a historic apartment building located at Indianapolis, Indiana.  It was built in 1927, and is a two-story, "I"-shaped Tudor Revival style masonry building.  It features a multi-gabled slate roof with 2½-story projecting gabled pavilion, decorative chimney, banks of leaded glass windows, and decorative half-timbering. The building was originally designed as a residential hotel and remodeled in 1971. It is located immediately next to the Manchester Apartments.

It was listed on the National Register of Historic Places in 1998.

References

External links

Apartment buildings in Indiana
Residential buildings on the National Register of Historic Places in Indiana
Residential buildings completed in 1927
Tudor Revival architecture in Indiana
Residential buildings in Indianapolis
National Register of Historic Places in Indianapolis